Joseph Campbell (born 1903) was an English professional footballer who played as a wing half.

Career
Born in Walker, Campbell played for Hull City, Bradford City and Yeovil and Petters United. For Bradford City, he made 1 appearance in the Football League.

Sources

References

1903 births
Year of death missing
English footballers
Hull City A.F.C. players
Bradford City A.F.C. players
Yeovil Town F.C. players
English Football League players
Association football wing halves